Bombay Talkies was a movie studio founded in 1934. During its period of operation, Bombay Talkies produced 40 movies in Malad, a suburb of the Indian city of Bombay.

The studio was established in 1934 by Himanshu Rai and Devika Rani. After Rai's death in 1940, Rani took over the studio. Besides the founders, Ashok Kumar was the leading actor of the studio until 1943, when he founded another studio, Filmistan, with Shashadhar Mukherjee. After Rani's retirement, Kumar and Mukherjee took over Bombay Talkies. The company went out of business in 1953. A last film produced by the studio was released in June 1954.

Early years
For the period in cinematic history it represented, Bombay Talkies was considered to be an innovative and highly resourced movie studio. In line with international standards, the studios' facilities included sound and echo-proof stages, laboratories, editing rooms and a preview theater. The reputation of Bombay Talkies was further enhanced by employing experienced European technicians, the most prominent of whom was Franz Osten.

Bombay Talkies set a high technical standard for film making in India and was credited with introducing a level of professionalism to the medium of movie making and acting, reputedly higher than standards set by rival Indian film production companies. Bombay Talkies acquired a reputation for changing the aesthetics and technology traditionally associated with Indian films. It was also renowned for producing films on (then) controversial topics such as those dealing with love between an untouchable lower caste girl and a high caste Hindu Brahmin boy e.g. (Achhut Kanya).

Devika Rani, who became one of Bombay Talkies' most successful actresses, and India's first film diva, appeared in Jawani ki Hawa (1935) and Jeevan Naiya (1936), as well as a number of other highly successful productions by the company. The studio was similarly recognized as having launched the careers of several prominent Indian film actors including Devika Rani, Ashok Kumar, Leela Chitnis, Mehmood Ali, Madhubala and Dilip Kumar. Madhubala and Dilip Kumar, who co-starred in four Bombay Talkies films, engaged in a long term, highly covert love affair. Raj Kapoor worked as an assistant to Amiya Chakravarty of Bombay Talkies, before becoming a famous director.

Success

Following the outbreak of World War II in 1939, the company faced a number of problems. The most significant change for the studio involved Himanshu Rai, the studio's founder, suffering a nervous breakdown which ultimately resulted in his demise. Following the shock caused by his demise, control of the film company passed on to Devika Rani who was appointed as the key producer of the Bombay Talkies studios. Despite, or perhaps because of, her prior experience as an actress, Devika Rani was highly successful in sustaining the production values of the company, and the studio subsequently retained its dominance over the rapidly expanding Indian film industry. The most successful Bombay Talkies films produced during this period included Kangan and Bandhan, both of which featured Leela Chitnis and Ashok Kumar. In 1943, Kismet created a local record for the longest continual showing of the same film. The movie continued to run for more than three and half years at the Roxy movie theater in Calcutta, India.

Decline

Despite Devika Rani's success as the Bombay Talkies' head producer, in 1943 a rift arose between her and her managers Sashadhar Mukherjee and Ashok Kumar. Although reasons for the rift have never been made public and largely remain unclear to film industry observers, Sashadhar Mukheerjee and Ashok Kumar allegedly attempted to begin their own production house under the guise of Bombay Talkies. Despite Devika Rani, Sashadhar Mukherjee, and Ashok Kumar attempting to create a working relationship which involved alternating production of major films between the two rival production camps, the relationship proved untenable and was fraught with allegations of sabotage, dramatic ego clashes, in-fighting, and the relentless circulation of malicious rumors.

Negotiations between Devika Rani on the one hand and Sashadhar Mukherjee and Ashok Kumar on the other failed to unite the company. Shashdhar Mukherjee, Ashok Kumar and a few others left the company in 1943 to found Filmistan. In 1945, Devika Rani married the Russian painter Svetoslav Roerich, sold her Bombay Talkies shares and left the industry. After several attempts to reunite the studio, it was sold to Tolaram Jalan, a businessman, who decided to cease its operations in 1953.

Timeline

1934: The Bombay Talkies film company is conceived and established.
1935: Jawani Ki Hawa, a thriller starring Devika Rani is released.
1936: Jeevan Naiya and Achhut Kanya are released to wide acclaim.
1940: Himanshu Rai, a key founder of the Bombay Talkies dies.
1942: Madhubala makes her debut as a child artist named Baby Mumtaz in the movie Basant.
1943: Kismet, a successful thriller, is released. It becomes the highest-grossing film of all time, also the first movie to collect 1 crore.
1944: Dilip Kumar's first movie Jwar Bhata is released.
1948: Ziddi, featuring Dev Anand is released, transforming the previously unknown actor into a well known celebrity.
1949: Mahal, becomes a blockbuster, making its leading lady Madhubala an overnight sensation.
1954: The Bombay Talkies company is closed down.
1969: Madhubala, who had worked in several Bombay Talkies productions passes away on 23 February 1969, at the age of 36.
1994: Devika Rani, a highly respected actress and former head of production for the Bombay Talkies studios dies in Bangalore on 9 March 1994.
2001: Ashok Kumar, who appeared in a number of Bombay Talkies productions dies on 10 December 2001.
2021: Dilip Kumar,a highly respected actor referred to as 'Tragedy king' passes away on 7 July 2021, at the age of 98.

Filmography
{| class="wikitable sortable"
|-
! Year
! Film
! Director
! Music Director
! Cast
|-
|1935
| Jawani Ki Hawa
|Franz Osten
|Saraswati Devi
|Najamul Hussain, Devika Rani
|-
|1936
| Achhut Kanya
|Franz Osten
|Saraswati Devi
|Ashok Kumar, Devika Rani
|-
|1936
| Janmabhoomi
|Franz Osten
|Saraswati Devi
|Ashok Kumar, Devika Rani
|-
|1936
| Jeevan Naiya
|Franz Osten
|Saraswati Devi
|Ashok Kumar, Devika Rani
|-
|1936
| Mamta and Miya Biwi
|Franz Osten
|Saraswati Devi
|Devika Rani, Najmul Hussain, J. S. Casshyap
|-
|1937
| Izzat
|Franz Osten
|Saraswati Devi
|Ashok Kumar, Devika Rani
|-
|1937
| Jeevan Prabhat
|Franz Osten
|Saraswati Devi
|Kishore Sahu, Devika Rani
|-
|1937
| Prem Kahani
|Franz Osten
|Saraswati Devi
|Ashok Kumar, Maya Devi
|-
|1937
| Savitri
|Franz Osten
|Saraswati Devi
|Ashok Kumar, Devika Rani
|-
|1938
| Bhabhi
|Franz Osten
|Saraswati Devi
|Renuka Devi, P Jairaj
|-
|1938
| Nirmala
|Franz Osten
|Saraswati Devi
|Ashok Kumar, Devika Rani
|-
|1938
| Vachan
|Franz Osten
|Saraswati Devi
|Ashok Kumar, Devika Rani
|-
|1939
| Durga
|Franz Osten
|Saraswati Devi
|Devika Rani, Rama Shukul
|-
|1939
| Kangan
|Franz Osten
|Saraswati Devi + Ramchandra Paal
|Leela Chitnis, Ashok Kumar
|-
|1939
| Navjeevan'
|Franz Osten
|Saraswati Devi
|Hansa Wadkar, Rama Shukul
|-
|1940
| Azad|N R Acharya
|Saraswati Devi + Ramchandra Paal
|Leela Chitnis, Ashok Kumar
|-
|1940
| Bandhan|N. R. Acharya
|Saraswati Devi + Ramchandra Paal
|Leela Chitnis, Ashok Kumar
|-
|1940
| Punar Milan|Najam Naqvi
|Ramchandra Paal
|Snehprabha, Kishore Sahu
|-
|1941
| Anjaan|Amiya Chakrabarty
|Pannalal Ghosh
|Devika Rani, Ashok Kumar
|-
|1941
| Jhoola|Gyan Mukherjee
|Saraswati Devi
|Leela Chitnis, Ashok Kumar
|-
|1941
| Naya Sansar|N. R. Acharya
|Saraswati Devi + Ramchandra Paal
|Renuka Devi, Ashok Kumar
|-
|1942
| Basant|Amiya Chakrabarty
|Pannalal Ghosh
|Mumtaz Shanti, Ullhas, Madhubala (debut)
|-
|1943
| Hamari Baat|M.I. Dharamsey
|Anil Biswas
|Devika Rani, Jairaj
|-
|1943
| Kismat (or Kismet or Qismat)
|Gyan Mukherjee
|Anil Biswas
|Ashok Kumar, Mumtaz Shanti
|-
|1944
| Char Ankhen|Sushil Majumdar
|Anil Biswas
|Jairaj, Leela Chitnis
|-
|1944
| Jwar Bhata|Amiya Chakravarty
|Anil Biswas
|Dilip Kumar (debut), Mrudula, Shamim
|-
|1945
| Pratima|Jairaj
|Arun Kumar Mukherjee
|Dilip Kumar, Swarnalata, Jyoti, Mukri
|-
|1946
| Milan|Nitin Bose
|Anil Biswas
|Dilip Kumar, Meera Mishra, Ranjana, Moni Chatterjee
|-
|1947
| Nateeja|Najam Naqvi
|Rasheed Atre
|Yaqub, Shamim, Majid Khan
|-
|1947
| Noukadubi|Nitin Bose
|Anil Biswas
|Abhi Bhattacharya, Meera Mishra
|-
|1948
| Majboor|Nazir Ajmeri
|Ghulam Haider
|Munnawar Sultana, Shyam, Sohan
|-
|1948
| Ziddi|Shaheed Latif
|Khemchand Prakash
|Kamini Kaushal, Dev Anand, Veera
|-
|1949
| Mahal|Kamal Amrohi
|Khemchand Prakash
|Ashok Kumar, Madhubala, Kumar
|-
|1950
| Samar|Nitin Bose
|S. D. Burman
|Sumitra Devi, Ashok Kumar
|-
|1950
| Sangram|Gyan Mukherjee
|C. Ramchandra
|Nalini Jaywant, Ashok Kumar, Nawab
|-
|1950
| Mashaal|Nitin Bose
|S. D. Burman
|Ashok Kumar, Sumitra Devi, Ruma Devi
|-
|1952
| Maa|Bimal Roy
|S. K. Pal
|Bharat Bhushan, Leela Chitnis, Kusum Deshpande, Arun Kumar
|-
|1952
| Tamasha|Phani Majumdar
|Manna Dey, S. K. Pal, Khemchand Prakash
|Dev Anand, Meena Kumari, Ashok Kumar
|-
|1954
| Baadbaan| Phani Majudar
|Timir Baran, S. K. Pal
|Dev Anand, Ashok Kumar, Meena Kumari
|}

References

Further reading
 Franz Osten and the Bombay Talkies: Journey from Munich to Malad'' by Amrita Ganger (Max Mueller Bhavan, Bombay, 2001)

Film studios in Mumbai
Mass media companies established in 1934
Mass media companies disestablished in 1953
1953 disestablishments in India
Indian companies established in 1934